André Matias (born 22 June 1989) is an Angolan rower. He competed in the men's lightweight double sculls event at the 2016 Summer Olympics. Matias and his partner Jean-Luc Rasamoelina finished second in the Men's Lightweight Double Sculls D-Final at the 2016 Rio Olympics, and 20th overall.

References

External links
 

1989 births
Living people
Angolan male rowers
Olympic rowers of Angola
Rowers at the 2016 Summer Olympics
Sportspeople from Luanda
Angolan people of Portuguese descent